Princess Feodora of Denmark (Feodora Louise Caroline-Mathilde Viktoria Alexandra Frederikke Johanne) (3 July 1910 – 17 March 1975) was a Danish princess as a  daughter of Prince Harald of Denmark and granddaughter of Frederick VIII of Denmark.

As the wife of Prince Christian of Schaumburg-Lippe she became a Princess of Schaumburg-Lippe by marriage.

Early life
 Princess Feodora was born on 3 July 1910 at the Jægersborghus country house in Gentofte north of Copenhagen, Denmark.

She was the first child and daughter of Prince Harald of Denmark, son of King Frederick VIII of Denmark and Princess Louise of Sweden. Her mother was Princess Helena of Schleswig-Holstein-Sonderburg-Glücksburg, daughter of Friedrich Ferdinand, Duke of Schleswig-Holstein-Sonderburg-Glücksburg and Princess Karoline Mathilde of Schleswig-Holstein-Sonderburg-Augustenburg.

Marriage and issue
Feodora married her first cousin, Prince Christian of Schaumburg-Lippe on 9 September 1937 at Fredensborg Palace, Zealand, Denmark. Prince Christian was a son of Prince Frederick of Schaumburg-Lippe and Princess Louise of Denmark who was a sister of Feodora's father, Prince Harald. Prince Christian was the head of a junior line of the House of Schaumburg-Lippe which resided at Náchod in Bohemia.

Feodora and Christian had four children:

 Prince Wilhelm of Schaumburg-Lippe (b. 19 August 1939).
 Prince Christian of Schaumburg-Lippe (b. 1971); married Lena Giese in 2009.
 Princess Desiree of Schaumburg-Lippe (b. 1974); married Michael Iuel and have three children.
 Prince Waldemar of Schaumburg-Lippe (b. 19 December 1940 - d. 11 August 2020).
 Princess Eleonore-Christine Eugenie Benita Feodora Maria of Schaumburg-Lippe (born 22 December 1978 in Hørsholm, Denmark)
 Mario-Max Prinz zu Schaumburg-Lippe (b.  23 December 1977), adult foster-son
 Princess Marie of Schaumburg-Lippe (b. 27 December 1945).
 Prince Harald of Schaumburg-Lippe (b. 27 March 1948).

Later life
Prince Christian died in 1974. Princess Feodora died on 17 March the following year in Bückeburg, Lower Saxony, Germany.

Ancestry

References

Citations

Bibliography

 

1910 births
1975 deaths
People from Gentofte Municipality
House of Glücksburg (Denmark)
House of Lippe
Danish princesses
Princesses of Schaumburg-Lippe